Yeung Chau is the name of three different islands in Hong Kong:

 Yeung Chau, North District, in North District
 Yeung Chau, Sai Kung District, in Sai Kung District
 Yeung Chau, Tai Po District, in Tai Po District